Mustang! is an album by American trumpeter Donald Byrd featuring performances by Byrd with Sonny Red, Hank Mobley, McCoy Tyner, Walter Booker, and Freddie Waits recorded in 1966 and released on the Blue Note label in 1967 as BLP 4238. The CD reissue included two bonus tracks recorded in 1964.

Reception
The Allmusic review by Scott Yanow awarded the album 3 stars and stated "Byrd performs high-quality straight-ahead jazz that fits the modern mainstream of the era".

Track listing
All compositions by Donald Byrd except as indicated

 "Mustang" (Sonny Red Kyner) - 8:30
 "Fly Little Bird Fly" - 5:27
 "I Got It Bad (and That Ain't Good)" (Duke Ellington, Paul Francis Webster) - 5:54
 "Dixie Lee" - 6:43
 "On the Trail" (Ferde Grofé) - 7:44
 "I'm So Excited by You" - 5:41
 "Gingerbread Boy" (Jimmy Heath) - 9:01 Bonus track on CD reissue
 "I'm So Excited by You" [First Version] - 7:17 Bonus track on CD reissue

Recorded on November 18, 1964 (tracks 7-8) and June 24, 1966 (tracks 1-6).

Personnel
Tracks 1-6
Donald Byrd - trumpet
Sonny Red - alto saxophone - except track 3
Hank Mobley - tenor saxophone
McCoy Tyner - piano
Walter Booker - bass
Freddie Waits - drums

Tracks 7-8
Donald Byrd - trumpet
McCoy Tyner - piano
Jimmy Heath - tenor saxophone
Walter Booker - bass
Joe Chambers - drums

References

1967 albums
Albums recorded at Van Gelder Studio
Blue Note Records albums
Donald Byrd albums
Albums produced by Alfred Lion